The 2012 MTN 8 Final was a football match which took place on Saturday, 22 September 2012 between SuperSport United and Moroka Swallows at the Orlando Stadium in Soweto, South Africa. The match was to decide the winner of the 2012 MTN 8 tournament.

Venue

The Orlando Stadium was announced by SAFA as the venue of the 2012 final.

Road to final

Match

Details

References

External links
MTN 8 Results, supersport.com
2012 final, Kickoff.com

MTN 8
MTN
2012 domestic association football cups